Hakam Umar As‘ad Balawi (Arabic: حكم بلعاوي; 1938 – 28 November 2020) was a Palestinian politician and a member of the Palestinian National Authority cabinet and the Palestinian Legislative Council.

Early life and education
Balawi was born in the town of Bal'a, near Tulkarm in British Mandate Palestine in 1938. He has diplomas in administration, journalism and education.

Career

Balawi became the deputy head of the central information committee of Fatah from 1968 to 1978. His political career began when he was assigned as the Palestine Liberation Organization's ambassador to Libya from 1973 to 1975. After, serving as ambassador he became a staunch Fatah activist and then served as an ambassador of the PLO to Tunisia from 1983 to 1994.

Yasser Arafat assigned Balawi the cabinet post of Interior Minister of the Palestinian National Authority in November 2003. His tenure lasted until 24 February 2005 when a new cabinet formed. Balawi was also a member of executive committee of Fatah, a member of the Palestinian National Council and the Secretary of the Union of Palestinian Writers and Journalists. During Arafat's presidency of the PNA and his chairmanship of the PLO, Balawi was said to be a "loyalist".

Personal life
Balawi engaged also in writing several plays and novels. He was married and had four children.

Balawi died on 28 November 2020, at the age of 82.

References

1938 births
2020 deaths
Ambassadors of the State of Palestine to Tunisia
Fatah members
Interior ministers of the Palestinian National Authority
Members of the 2006 Palestinian Legislative Council
Members of the 1996 Palestinian Legislative Council
Palestinian expatriates in Cyprus
Palestinian expatriates in Saudi Arabia
Central Committee of Fatah members